Babak Amin Tafreshi (born 1978 in Tehran, Iran) is an Iranian photographer, science journalist, and amateur astronomer. He is the creator and director of The World At Night (TWAN), an international program in which photographers from around the world capture images of night skies as seen above notable landmarks of the planet. He is also a member of the board of advisors of Astronomers Without Borders and a project coordinator for the International Year of Astronomy (IYA2009).

In 2009, he won the Lennart Nilsson Award for best scientific photography, in joint effort with NASA's Cassini Imaging Director Carolyn Porco.

Gallery

References

Iranian astronomers
1978 births
Living people